The Universities Rugby League Queensland is an affiliated body of the Queensland Rugby League, established to promote the development of Rugby League within Universities, TAFE and other Tertiary Institutes within the state of Queensland.

History 

The URLQ runs a six team competition featuring the following universities.

See also

NSW Tertiary Student Rugby League

References

External links
AURL
NSWTRL
URLQ

Queensland Rugby League
Rugby league governing bodies in Australia
Sport at Australian universities
Rugby league in Queensland
Rugby league competitions in Queensland
Sports organizations established in 1970
University and college rugby league